This is the first edition of the tournament.

Seeds

Draw

Finals

Top half

Bottom half

References
Main Draw
Qualifying Draw

BFD Energy Challenger - Singles